Khvoshchinka is a rural locality (a khutor) in Moretskoye Rural Settlement, Yelansky District, Volgograd Oblast, Russia. The population was 258 as of 2010.

Geography 
Khvoshchinka is located on Khopyorsko-Buzulukskaya Plain, on the bank of the Vyazovka River, 40 km northeast of Yelan (the district's administrative centre) by road. Shchelokovka is the nearest rural locality.

References 

Rural localities in Yelansky District
Atkarsky Uyezd